Henry C. Gonzalez (May 3, 1935 – March 28, 2020) was an American politician. He served as mayor of South Gate, California on several occasions.

Gonzalez was born in Los Angeles. His father was an immigrant from the Mexican state of Sinaloa. Gonzales was raised in the neighborhood of Watts, and moved to South Gate in 1961, and worked for the United Auto Workers.

Gonzalez was elected to the South Gate City Council 1982. He became the first Latino to be elected to the council as well as the mayoral position, which he attained one year later in 1983. He lost re-elected in 1988, but returned in 1994, and served until 2015. He served one-year terms as mayor in 1983, 1987, 1998, 1999, 2004 and 2009. Gonzalez survived an assassination attempt in 1999, when he was shot in the head by an unknown assailant; the bullet ricocheted off his skull.

Gonzalez was president of the South Gate Rotary Club, and he organized and founded the South Gate High School Booster Club in 1974. He has been a member of the Labor Council for Latin American Advancement for over twenty years and served as National President from 1996 to 2000. Gonzalez was also chairperson and vice chairperson of the Labor Ad Hoc Committee for Plaza de la Raza, located in Lincoln Park (Los Angeles) and served on the Executive Boards of Plaza de La Raza and TELACU (a community development corporation) in the late 1970s. Gonzalez was awarded the Siempre Juntos Award in December 2000.

Gonzalez married his wife, Theresa, in 1956. They had two children, seven grandchildren, and three great-grandchildren. Gonzalez died at a hospital in Whittier, California on March 28, 2020, at age 84.

References

1935 births
2020 deaths
20th-century American politicians
21st-century American politicians
American politicians of Mexican descent
American shooting survivors
Mayors of places in California
People from South Gate, California
People from Watts, Los Angeles